The Battle of Cape Passero (1940), was a Second World War naval engagement between the British light cruiser  and seven torpedo boats and destroyers of the Italian Regia Marina, southeast of Sicily, in the early hours of 12 October 1940. It took place in the aftermath of a British supply operation to Malta.

Background
In October 1940, the Mediterranean Fleet mounted a resupply operation to Malta from Alexandria, designated MB6. The convoy had four cargo ships escorted by two anti-aircraft cruisers and four destroyers. The screening force was led by Vice-Admiral Sir Andrew Cunningham's flagship, and included three other battleships, two aircraft carriers, six cruisers, and 16 destroyers. The only remarkable incident during the convoy was some damage to the destroyer  when she ran into a minefield. The merchantmen reached their destination on 11 October. Until then, bad weather had prevented the intervention of the Italian Fleet. An aircraft spotted the returning ships shortly after they had left Malta. Meanwhile, HMS Ajax was detached from the other cruisers for a scouting mission.

Engagement
The Italian commander—Admiral Inigo Campioni—ordered a force of destroyers to Cape Bon, in case the British warships were going to Gibraltar. In Campioni's view, it was too late for the Italian battleships and cruisers to operate against the convoy.

Torpedo boat action
At 01:48, the three torpedo boats were closing the British cruiser at full speed. The cruiser was completely unaware of the enemy approach. Captain Banfi, commander of the Italian formation, ordered the flagship Airone to open fire on the enemy with her  guns, followed by her sister ships.

Ajax realised she was under attack and opened fire on the nearest torpedo boat—Ariel—while at full speed. Ariel was shattered by the salvos and sank 20 minutes later, although she may have been able to fire a torpedo. Captain Mario Ruta, his second in command, and most of the crew were killed. Airone was the next Italian ship to be hit. She managed to launch two torpedoes before being disabled, catching fire almost immediately, her bridge and upper deck machine-gunned by Ajax at short range. She sank a few hours later. Banfi was among the survivors. Then Alcione—the only Italian warship undamaged—broke contact at 02:03.

Destroyer action
Meanwhile, after manoeuvring during the fighting, Ajax resumed her course to the eastward. At 02:15, her fire-control radar detected two Italian destroyers, whose commander—Captain Carlo Margottini—had sighted the firing from the south. A radio malfunction had prevented Margottini from attacking in full strength, when three of his destroyers had headed north-west, instead of north as ordered. Aviere was battered by a sudden broadside from the British cruiser, forestalling a torpedo attack, and was forced to withdraw southwards, heavily damaged. Artigliere managed to fire a torpedo and four full  gun salvos at  before being hit and crippled. The torpedo missed, but four rounds struck two of Ajax’s secondary gun turrets, destroyed her port whaler and disabled her radar. After unsuccessfully firing at Camicia Nera, Ajax broke off the action. She had fired 490 rounds of different calibres and four torpedoes. Thirteen of her ship's company had been killed and 22 wounded, while the cruiser required a month of repairs before she returned to active service.

The disabled Artigliere—with her commander and most staff officers killed—was taken in tow by Camicia Nera. They were surprised at first light by the cruiser , which drove off Camicia Nera before sinking the drifting Artigliere with a torpedo. The survivors were rescued the next day by the Italian Navy.

Aftermath
This action had been the Regia Marina’s first experience of the Royal Navy's superior skills and equipment in night actions. The extensive use of starshells, searchlights and incendiary rounds by the Royal Navy had to be countered, before the Italians could close the technical gap. They also suspected the enemy's use of radar, but at this time it was only speculation. They concluded that poor Italian air surveillance had prevented a quick reaction by the Italian heavy units, handing the tactical advantage to the British of avoiding contact in unfavourable conditions.

Notes

References
 Bragadin, Marc'Antonio (1957). The Italian Navy in World War II, United States Naval Institute, Annapolis. .
 Green, Jack & Massignani, Alessandro (1998). The Naval War in the Mediterranean, 1940-1943, Chatam Publishing, London. .
 
 Sierra, Luis de la (1976). La guerra naval en el Mediterráneo, 1940-1943, Ed. Juventud, Barcelona. . .

External links

 Battle off Cape Passero

Cape Passero (1940)
1940 in Italy
Cape Passero (1940)
Mediterranean convoys of World War II
Cape Passero
October 1940 events